The Volkswagen Electronics Research Laboratory (VWERL) is a division of the Volkswagen Group of America, Inc., with its headquarters in Silicon Valley (Belmont, California).

The VWERL's slogan Technology to the People! indicates its mission: to leverage Silicon Valley resources for the advancement of the Volkswagen Groups' products through technical knowledge and electronics expertise.

The VWERL has recently received media attention surrounding its joint victory with Stanford University in the DARPA Grand Challenge, a prize competition for driverless cars.

History
The Volkswagen Electronics Research Laboratory was founded in August 1998, and VWERL began operations in October 1998, with three employees.  As of December 2002, the lab had outgrown its Sunnyvale, California office and moved to Palo Alto.  In 2011 it moved again to Belmont. This current location provides a spacious office, workshop and prototyping areas for about 60 workers.  It supports VWERL employees at Volkswagen Group of America's offices in Auburn Hills, Michigan, and the new headquarters at Herndon, Virginia.

Affiliation
The VWERL supports all brands within the Volkswagen Group.  This includes Volkswagen Passenger Cars, Škoda, Bentley, and Bugatti as well as Audi, SEAT, and Lamborghini.  In addition to working with research and development teams in Germany, the VWERL also supports the development of U.S.-specific features for the Volkswagen Group of America.

Research "teams" at VWERL
The VWERL comprises four teams:
Driver Information and Assistance (DIA) - Instrumentation, visualization systems
Human Machine Interface (HMI) - Interface concepts for driver assistance, infotainment systems
Connected Vehicle (CV) - wireless infotainment, collaborative intelligence, distributed computing
Test Concepts and Validations (TCV) - Testing procedures, specifications compliance

Headquarters
The VWERL's headquarters are located at 500 Clipper Drive, Belmont CA.

See also

List of German cars
Volkswagen Group
Volkswagen Group of America

References

External links
VWERL.com-  VW Electronics Research Laboratory official website
VolkswagenGroupAmerica.com - Volkswagen Group of America, Inc. corporate website
Stanford Racing Team

Companies established in 1998
Volkswagen Group
Electronics Research Laboratory
Technology companies based in the San Francisco Bay Area